Italia is a feminine given name and a surname. Notable people with the name are given as follows:

Given name
 Italia Almirante Manzini (1890–1941), Italian actress of the silent film era
 Italia Conti (1873–1946), English actress 
 Italia Coppola (1912–2004), matriarch of the Coppola family
 Italia Federici (born 1969), American politician
 Italia Ricci (born 1986), Canadian actress
 Italia Vitaliani (1866–1938), Italian actress of the silent film era

Surname
 Angelo Italia (1628–1700), Italian Jesuit and Baroque architect
 Francesco Italia (born 1972), Italian politician
 Gopal Italia (born 1989), Indian politician
 Salom Italia (ca. 1619–ca. 1655), Italian engraver based in Amsterdam

Nicknames
 Itália, nickname of Luiz Gervazoni (1907–1963), Brazilian international footballer

Italian feminine given names
Surnames of Italian origin
Surnames from given names